Lucy Peacock (born October 4, 1960) is a Canadian actress best known for major stage roles at the Stratford Shakespeare Festival in Canada during the course of over 25 years.

Background
Lucy Peacock was born on October 4, 1960 in England. She is the daughter of theatre administrator David Peacock and Georgia Thorndike, niece of the actress Sybil Thorndike. She graduated from the National Theatre School of Canada in 1983.

Stratford Shakespeare Festival credits
Peacock began her association with the Stratford Shakespeare Festival in 1984 and over the course of 27 years and 60 productions (up to 2013) has played major stage roles in classical theater, including over 30 by William Shakespeare, as well as several musicals. 

The Miser (2022) by Molière (translation by Ranjit Bolt)
  Richard III (2022) by William Shakespeare
Three Tall Women (2021) by Edward Albee
 The Merry Wives of Windsor (2019) by William Shakespeare
 Private Lives (2019) by Noël Coward
 Twelfth Night (2017) by William Shakespeare — Maria 
 The Bacchantes (2017) by Euripides — Agave 
 John Gabriel Borkman (2016) by Henrik Ibsen — Gunhild Borkman
 The Beaux' Stratagem (2014) by George Farquhar — Mrs Sullen 
 Hay Fever (2014) by Noël Coward — Judith Bliss
 Mary Stuart (2013) by Friedrich Schiller — Mary Stuart
 The Thrill (2013) by Judith Thompson — Elora
 Henry V (2012) by William Shakespeare — Pistol's Wife
 The Merry Wives of Windsor (2011) by William Shakespeare — Mistress Ford
 For the Pleasure of Seeing Her Again (2010) by Michel Tremblay — Nana
 Bartholomew Fair (2009) by Ben Jonson — Ursula the Pigwoman
 The Three Sisters (2009) by Anton Chekhov — Masha
 The Trespassers (2009) by Morris Panych — Roxy
 All's Well That Ends Well (2008) by William Shakespeare — Helena
 Romeo and Juliet (2008) by William Shakespeare — Juliet's Nurse
 The Taming of the Shrew (2008) by William Shakespeare — Grumio
 Othello (2007) by William Shakespeare — Emilia
 The Blonde, the Brunette and the Vengeful Redhead (2006) by Robert Hewett — Monologue
 The Duchess of Malfi (2006) by John Webster — Duchess
 Much Ado About Nothing (2006) by William Shakespeare — Beatrice
 Othello (2005) by William Shakespeare — Desdemona
 Fallen Angels (2005) by Noël Coward — Jane Banbury
 Hello, Dolly! (2005) based on a play by Thornton Wilder — Dolly
 Macbeth (2004) by William Shakespeare — Lady Macbeth
 The King and I (2003) based on a novel by Margaret Landon — Anna Leonowens
 King Lear (2002) by William Shakespeare — Regan 
 The Merchant of Venice (2001) by William Shakespeare — Portia
 As You Like It (2000) by William Shakespeare — Audrey
 Pride and Prejudice (1999) based on a novel by Jane Austen — Elizabeth
 The Taming of the Shrew (1997) by William Shakespeare — Katherine
 Coriolanus (1997) by William Shakespeare — Valeria
 Othello (1994) by William Shakespeare — Desdemona
 The School for Husbands and The Imaginary Cuckold (1994) by Molière — Lénore
 Twelfth Night (1994) by William Shakespeare — Viola
 A Midsummer Night's Dream (1993) by William Shakespeare — Titania
 The Importance of Being Earnest (1993) by Oscar Wilde — Gwendolyn Fairfax
 The Bacchae (1993) by Euripides — Part of the Chorus
 Love's Labour's Lost (1992) by William Shakespeare — Princess of France
 As You Like It (1990) by William Shakespeare — Rosalind
 A Midsummer Night's Dream (1989) by William Shakespeare — Titania
 The Three Sisters (1989) by Anton Chekhov — Masha
 The Comedy of Errors (1989) by William Shakespeare — Adriana
 A Midsummer Night's Dream (1989) by William Shakespeare — Titania
 All's Well That Ends Well (1989) by William Shakespeare — Helena
 The Taming of the Shrew (1988) by William Shakespeare — 
 Twelfth Night (1988) by William Shakespeare — Viola
 My Fair Lady (1988) based on a play by George Bernard Shaw — Eliza Doolittle 
 Richard III (1988) by William Shakespeare — Lady Anne
 Hamlet (1986) by William Shakespeare — Ophelia

Broadway credits
 King Lear (2004) by William Shakespeare — Regan (Vivian Beaumont Theater, 4 March 2004 to 18 April 2004)

Credits at other theatres
 Do You Turn Somersaults? (2011) by Aleksei Arbuzov at Talk Is Free Theatre.

Movies and TV
She is credited with 9 film/TV roles: As You Like It (2010, Audrey), Forever Knight (1996, Peggy Bolger), Goosebumps (1996, Mrs. Brewer), Kung Fu: The Legend Continues (1995, Marilyn), Demons (1995, Marilyn), 1992 Avonlea (1992, Amelia Sandhurst), Street Legal (1992), June Woodruff, The Comedy of Errors (1989, Luciana), Hangin' In (1983, Lucia, The Love Program (1983, Lucia), Der Opernball (1978, Marguérite).

Video clips

As Mary Stuart in Schiller's Mary Stuart, 2013

Discussing her role as the Nurse in Shakespeare's Romeo and Juliet, 2008

Discussing her role as Grumio in Shakespeare's The Taming of the Shrew, 2008

Publications
Peacock is the author of a facetious book of poems entitled "Limericks by Lucy Peacock as The Duchess of Malfi - written as she lay dead on the stage" (2011).

External links

References

Canadian stage actresses
Canadian film actresses
Living people
1960 births
English emigrants to Canada
Canadian expatriates in England
National Theatre School of Canada alumni
Canadian Shakespearean actresses